The Hiller ROE Rotorcycle was a single-seat ultralight helicopter designed in 1953 for a military requirement. A total of 12 were produced for the United States Marine Corps. And in 1954, the Hiller Helicopters was selected by the US Navy's Bureau of Aeronautics to build this design of a one-man, foldable, self-rescue and observation helicopter. It featured a two-blade rotor system.

Development
The helicopter folded up and could be carried on a sled-like carrier by two people or could be air-dropped to pilots trapped behind enemy lines. The Marines did not accept the YROE due to its low performance, vulnerability to small-arms fire and the lack of visual references on the structure. This problem could cause the pilot to experience spatial disorientation at all but very low altitudes. The YROE or ROE never saw military service.

In 1954, the United States Navy′s Bureau of Aeronautics selected Hiller to build its proposed design of a one-man helicopter. The XROE Rotocycle completed flight testing in mid-1957.

It was demonstrated at the Pentagon in Arlington, Virginia, for military and other government officials in early April 1958.

Production was by Saunders-Roe, which made five for the United States Marine Corps and five for Helicop-Air of Paris.

A Porsche engine of  developed for the YROE completed trials by 1961.

Variants
XROE-1 
2 prototypes built as Model 1033 at the Hiller Helicopter Plant in Palo Alto, California
The first flight in November 1956
YROE-1 
5 test versions built by British Saunders-Roe company One donated to the Smithsonian Institution after completion of its testing in 1961
ROE-1
5 production built by Saunders-Roe (built ten production models, including the five YROE-1s)

Specifications

Survivors
 XROE-1, on display at Hiller Aviation Museum, San Carlos, California
 YROE-1, ser. no. 4021, on display at Hiller Aviation Museum
 YROE-1, on display at National Air and Space Museum, Washington, DC
 YROE-1, N4230U, ser. no. 4024, El Cajon, California
 YROE-1, N777MV, ser. no. 4020, Minicopter Inc., Saginaw, Texas
 YROE-1, third one in production on display at Evergreen Aviation Museum
 XROE-1, repainted in blue, powered by a Rotax 503 and renamed "fantacopter", in working order at Bois-la-Pierre, France.

See also

References
Notes

Bibliography
 Apostolo, Giorgio. The Illustrated Encyclopedia of Helicopters. New York: Bonanza Books. 1984. .

External links

 Hiller Aviation Museum: The First 100 Years of Aviation
 NASA: FLIGHT TESTS OF A ONE-MAN HELICOPTER AND A COMPARISON OF ITS HANDLING QUALITIES WITH THOSE OF LARGER VTOL AIRCRAFT
 Photo: XROE-1 at Hiller Aviation Museum
 Photo: YROE-1 (s/n 4021 at Hiller Aviation Museum

Military helicopters
RO1E
1950s United States helicopters
Aircraft first flown in 1956
Single-engined piston helicopters